Svetlana Deshevykh (born 30 November 1970) is a Kazakhstani cross-country skier. She competed at the 1998 Winter Olympics and the 2002 Winter Olympics.

Cross-country skiing results
All results are sourced from the International Ski Federation (FIS).

Olympic Games

World Championships

a.  Cancelled due to extremely cold weather.

World Cup

Season standings

References

1970 births
Living people
Kazakhstani female cross-country skiers
Olympic cross-country skiers of Kazakhstan
Cross-country skiers at the 1998 Winter Olympics
Cross-country skiers at the 2002 Winter Olympics
Sportspeople from Irkutsk
Asian Games medalists in cross-country skiing
Cross-country skiers at the 1999 Asian Winter Games
Asian Games gold medalists for Kazakhstan
Medalists at the 1999 Asian Winter Games
20th-century Kazakhstani women
21st-century Kazakhstani women